Wuji County is a county of Hebei Province, North China, it is under the administration of the prefecture-level city of Shijiazhuang, the provincial capital. Wuji County has 6 towns, 4 townships and 1 Hui autonomous township, total 213 villages. It borders Shenze County to the east, Gaocheng District to the west and southwest, Dingzhou City to the north, and Jinzhou City to the southeast.

Administrative divisions

Wuji County is a county under the jurisdiction of Shijiazhuang City, Hebei Province, People's Republic of China. It covers an area of 524 square kilometers, has 213 administrative villages, and has a population of 530,000. It is located in the northeast of Shijiazhuang and the lower reaches of the Hutuo River. Futuo River is located in the southern part of the county and is the boundary river between Wuji, Jinzhou City, and Gaocheng District. It was named Wuji in 697 AD (Wu Zetian period) and it is still in use today.

The leather processing industry is the largest pillar industry of Wuji; the pharmaceutical industry is one of Wuji's traditional industries, and the home furnishing industry is a new industry of Wuji.

The province is the largest greenhouse cucumber and leek production base in northern China.

The Wuji paper-cut was listed as the first batch of intangible cultural heritage by Hebei Province in 2006.

Promise specialties include Promise glutinous rice, Crock-stove biscuits, Promise grilled cakes, and so on.

Climate

References

External links
Wuji County Government Website

 
County-level divisions of Hebei
Shijiazhuang